Jan Hromek (born 8 June 1989) is a Czech footballer, who plays as a midfielder. He currently plays for 1. HFK Olomouc.

External links

Profile at fczb.cz 

1989 births
People from Vyškov
Living people
Czech footballers
FK Viktoria Žižkov players
FC Zbrojovka Brno players
1. HFK Olomouc players
Association football midfielders
Sportspeople from the South Moravian Region